Kind Heaven is the second studio album by American musician Perry Farrell. The album was released on June 7, 2019, by PerryEttyVS and BMG Rights Management.

Critical reception

Kind Heaven received generally positive reviews from critics. At Metacritic, which assigns a normalized rating out of 100 to reviews from critics, the album received an average score of 70, which indicates "generally favorable reviews", based on 10 reviews.

Track listing

Charts

References

2019 albums
Perry Farrell albums
Albums produced by Tony Visconti